RRRecords is a record label and used- and new-record shop based in Lowell, Massachusetts. RRRecords was the first American record label to publish underground "noise music" in the early 1980s as well as publishing the first American vinyl by Merzbow, Masonna, Hanatarash, Violent Onsen Geisha, and various other artists. In its first twenty years, the label issued hundreds of releases. RRR's owner, Ron Lessard, is a supporter of new artists who has created several sub-labels and series to specifically highlight unknown and underground musicians.

RRR Sub-labels and series

One of the most popular of the RRR sub-labels is the Recycled Music series, which consists of used cassette tapes of pop and rock music that have been taped over with new music by a noise band. RRRecycled tapes are labeled with a simple strip of adhesive tape along the spine of the insert with the artist's name hand-written upon it. Each recycled release tape is unique, and in some cases, the original audio is still partly audible. They have historically sold for $4 each, in order to encourage curious listeners to take a chance on a band they may not have heard of.

Other sub-labels have included Lowell records, which only published local rock, punk, and metal bands from Lowell, Massachusetts; Statutory Tapes, which reissued music originally published by Kinky Music Institute, G.R.O.S.S, ZSF Tapes, and Beast 666 Tapes; Pure, a series of low-cost CDs by new and established harsh noise bands, again to encourage listeners to take a chance on what might be a new name; RRReport, a magazine and CD set that existed for two issues; Stomach Ache, a collaborative label by Lessard and other unknown participants that published cheap vinyl singles of dubious provenance. Stomach Ache Records listed only a Mexican mailing address, and credited to the singles to a fictional person named Charlie Ward, so that any responsibility could be deflected. RRR has also collaborated with other labels to produce multi-LP box sets of noise based on specific regions of America. To date these have included New England, California, Texas, Michigan, and Portland.

Package design

In the 1980s and early 1990s, RRRecords was known for elaborate packaging of its records. "Steel Plate" is a double 10" vinyl set by Chop Shop, which came sealed in between two 10" x 10" steel plates. A collaborative LP by SBOTHI, Merzbow, and P16.D4 came packaged in between two silk-screened sheets of plexi-glass. "God Bless America" was a 3xLP box set compilation of American experimental music which came wrapped in a purpose-made American flag.

Concerts at RRR

For a period of a few years in the late 1990s, RRRecords would host free Saturday afternoon concerts at the store, which were called the "2 O'Clock Matinee" series. Concerts were never advertised or promoted, but every one was recorded by Ron Lessard and every band always got paid $20.

Mail-order

Lessard's Xeroxed copies of a mail order list added to underground 'zines circulating in the mid-to-late 1980s had a profound effect on the international noise communities, building interest in the music through minimal, very simple black and white advertisements. Catalogs never included descriptions of bands or records, so a new reader was expected to either already know what they were getting, or else buy things at random. Many of today's noise artists learned about the genre in part by being exposed to RRRecords catalogs.

The print catalog is no longer available, but a website has taken its place.

Partial RRR Discography (in no particular order)

As a label, RRR has a very expansive discography.  Some of the music was co-released with Troniks, Freak Animal, Ground Fault Recordings, SSS, Satutory Tape, Nurse With Wound's label (United Dairies), and more. Notable releases include:

 Recycled Music cassettes from most established noise artists.
 Emil Beaulieau/Zipper Spy/K.K. Null - Japan 2000
 Merzbow - Pornoise 1 kg (5 cassette box-set)
 Can't - New Secret
 Jason Lescalleet - Electronic Music
 Boy Dirt Car - Winter
 Hanatarash - Hanatarash 3
 Burning Star Core - Let's Play Wild Like Wildcats Do
 Skullflower - Obsidian Shaking Codex
 Human Is Filth - Destroys Emil Beaulieau CD
 Sickness - Fuck Your Punk Rock
 Ichorous - Lifender
 Merzbow - Batztoutai With Memorial Gadgets
 Karlheinz - Fucking
 Chop Shop - "Steel Plate"
 blackhouse - "Holy War"
 P16.D4 - "Three Projects"
 K2 & Macronympha - "Biometrics"
 Anenzephalia - "Fragments of Demise"
 Violent Onsen Geisha - "The Midnight Gambler"
 Emil Beaulieau - "That Velvet Touch"
 Ramleh - "We Created It, Let's Take it Over 1-3"
 Sudden Infant - "Solothurn"
 Small Cruel Party & Chop Shop - "Split"
 various artists - New England (5 LP box-set with hand-made cover art)
 Master Slave Relationship - This Lubricious Love

See also
 List of record labels

Cassette culture 1970s–1990s

Notes

External links
 RRRecords website
 RRRecords entry @ Discogs.com
 RRR Discography

American record labels
Noise music record labels